Proof Positive is a 1964 album by American jazz trombonist J. J. Johnson featuring performances recorded in 1964 for the Impulse! label.

Reception
The Allmusic review by Scott Yanow awarded the album 4½ stars stating "This CD reissue finds trombonist J.J. Johnson in prime form. In fact, his melancholy minor-toned explorations often recall Miles Davis, whose group he had played with the year before".

Track listing
LP Side 'A'
"Neo" (Miles Davis) – 10:19
"Lullaby Of Jazzland" (Manny Albam, Rick Ward) – 5:08
"Stella By Starlight" (Ned Washington, Victor Young) – 4:02
LP Side 'B'
"Minor Blues" (J.J. Johnson) – 8:04
"My Funny Valentine" (Lorenz Hart, Richard Rodgers) – 3:02
"Blues Waltz" (Max Roach) – 8:05
Bonus track on CD re-issue
"Gloria" (Bronislaw Kaper) – 3:04

all tracks recorded in New York City on May 1, 1964 except "Lullaby Of Jazzland" recorded at Rudy Van Gelder Studio in Englewood Cliffs, New Jersey around July 4, 1964

Personnel
J. J. Johnson – trombone
Harold Mabern – piano
Arthur Harper, Jr. – bass
Frank Gant – drums
"Lullaby Of Jazzland": 
J.J. Johnson – trombone
McCoy Tyner – piano
Richard Davis – bass
Elvin Jones – drums
Toots Thielemans – guitar

References

Impulse! Records albums
J. J. Johnson albums
1964 albums
Albums recorded at Van Gelder Studio
Albums produced by Bob Thiele